, there were about 29,000 electric vehicles registered in Arizona, equivalent to one for every 250 residents, the seventh-highest in the United States.

Government policy
Initially, Arizona's registration fee for electric vehicles was 1% of the equivalent fee for gas-powered vehicles. However, this changed to 20% in 2022, and will become 100% in 2023.

Charging stations
, there were about 900 public charging station locations with 2,200 charging ports in Arizona.

The Infrastructure Investment and Jobs Act, signed into law in November 2021, allocates  to charging stations in Arizona.

Manufacturing
Arizona is home to a large number of electric vehicle manufacturing plants, including those for Rivian, Lucid Motors, and Nikola. The state "has the potential to become a massive global leader in emerging auto manufacturing". Arizona has also been proposed as a hub for copper mining, with the intent of using copper for electric vehicles.

By region

Flagstaff
In March 2021, electric vehicle manufacturer UACJ Whitehall announced plans to build a  plant in Flagstaff.

Phoenix
, there were 63 public charging stations in Phoenix.

Tucson
In June 2021, the Tucson city council approved an ordinance requiring new single- and double-family homes to have at least one parking space designated for electric vehicle charging.

Indian reservations
In December 2021, the Salt River Pima–Maricopa Indian Community announced plans to fully transition its community bus fleet to electric.

References

Road transportation in Arizona
Arizona